David Kent Reynolds is an author and the founder of Constructive Living.
He was a faculty member at the UCLA School of Public Health, the University of Southern California School of Medicine and the University of Houston.  He is currently Director of the Constructive Living Center in Coos Bay, Oregon.
In 1988 he was retained by the World Health Organization (WHO) to teach Constructive Living to professional health workers in China.  Dr. Reynolds studied Morita therapy and Naikan and lectures on these subjects to Japanese in Japanese in Japan.  He is the only non-Japanese citizen to have received the Morita Prize and the Kora Prize from the Morita Therapy Association in Japan.
Reynolds, an American, currently divides his time between Japan and the United States.

Books
Many of Reynolds' books about Constructive Living contain a reference to water in their title.  They have been published in eight countries around the world.
 Suicide Inside and Out, University of California Press, 1976
 Morita Psychotherapy, University of California Press, 1976
 The Quiet Therapies, University of Hawaii Press, 1980
 Naikan Psychotherapy, University of Chicago Press, 1983
 Constructive Living, University of Hawaii Press, 1984
 Playing Ball on Running Water, Morrow, 1984
 Living Lessons, Asahi Press, 1984
 Even in Summer the Ice Doesn't Melt, Morrow, 1986
 Water Bears no Scars, Morrow, 1987
 Flowing Bridges, Quiet Waters, SUNY Press, 1989
 Pools of Lodging for the Moon, Morrow, 1989
 A Thousand Waves, Morrow, 1990
 Thirsty, Swimming in the Lake, Morrow, 1991
 Plunging Through the Clouds, SUNY Press, 1993
 Rainbow Rising from a Stream, Morrow, 1992
 Reflections on the Tao te Ching, Morrow, 1993
 A Handbook of Constructive Living, Morrow, 1995; University of Hawaii Press, 2002
 Light Waves: Fine Tuning the Mind, University of Hawaii Press, 2001
 Water, Snow, Water, University of Hawaii Press, 2013.
and many recent Kindle books, all combined totaling 50 titles.

References

External links
 http://constructiveliving1.weebly.com
 http://constructiveliving2.weebly.com

American psychotherapists
Living people
Year of birth missing (living people)